Henry Rollins: Uncut is an American television series that premiered on November 7, 2008, on IFC.

The special event series follows musician, author, and spoken-word artist Henry Rollins as he travels to controversial locals including New Orleans, Israel, and South Africa. At each location he shares his outspoken commentary on politics, culture, and media.

The series is filmed at various locations and is produced by Swift River Productions.

Episodes

References

American television talk shows
IFC (American TV channel) original programming